Sabbavaram is a mandal in Anakapalli district in the state of Andhra Pradesh in India. 

There are three universities in the town:
 Damodaram Sanjivayya National Law University
 Indian Institute of Petroleum and Energy 
 Indian Maritime University, Visakhapatnam

References 

Mandals in Anakapalli district
Neighbourhoods in Visakhapatnam